is a Japanese politician from the Democratic Party, and a member of the House of Representatives in the Diet (national legislature) from 1986 to 2017. A native of Ōmihachiman, Shiga, he attended Kyoto University and received a master's degree from it. His elder brother is former mayor of Omihachiman Gohei Kawabata.  In September 2011 he was appointed as Minister of Internal Affairs and Communications in the cabinet of newly appointed prime minister Yoshihiko Noda. He was relieved from the post on 1 October 2012. In September 2017, Kawabata announced that he would not run in the 2017 general election and would retire from politics.

Life 
Born in Gamo-gun, Shiga prefecture (now Omihachiman city ). The birthplace ran a pharmacy . Graduated from Shiga Prefectural Hikone East High School, Kyoto University Faculty of Engineering. Joined Toray after completing a master's program at the Graduate School of Engineering, Kyoto University. Besides being involved in development research, he also worked on the trade union movement.

Notes and references

External links
 Official website in Japanese.

|-

|-

|-

|-

|-

|-

|-

1945 births
Living people
21st-century Japanese politicians
Culture ministers of Japan
Democratic Party of Japan politicians
Education ministers of Japan
Government ministers of Japan
Members of the House of Representatives (Japan)
Ministers of Internal Affairs of Japan
Noda cabinet
Science ministers of Japan
Sports ministers of Japan
Technology ministers of Japan